The  is the governing body of basketball in Japan. Formed in 1930, it is based in Tokyo. The JBA is a member of FIBA and FIBA Asia.

The federation is responsible for the Japan national basketball team and the Japan women's national basketball team and their Under-age teams.
It also manages the B.League commenced in October 2016.

As of April 2021, its president has been Yuko Mitsuya.

History

The JBA was suspended by FIBA on 25 November 2014 for failure to restructure as a fully functional entity and merge two competing leagues (the National Basketball League and the bj league) that had different rules (FIBA and NBA respectively).
Yasuhiko Fukatsu had earlier resigned as JBA president on 23 October as talks of a merger between the two leagues fell through. 
This sanction prevented the JBA from participating in activities (sporting or otherwise) of FIBA and FIBA Asia, which also meant that the national teams would not be able to take part in any FIBA competition.

Japan 2024 Task Force (the task force implemented by FIBA in order to reform basketball management in the country) co-chairman Saburō Kawabuchi was chosen as JBA president on 13 May 2015, on recommendation from FIBA.
In May of that year, the Japanese national teams were again allowed to take part in FIBA competition, starting with the 2015 FIBA Asia Women's Championship and 2015 FIBA Asia Championship, with suspension expected to be lifted at FIBA's Central Board meeting taking place in Tokyo in August.
The suspension was lifted on 9 August 2015, with FIBA praising the work done over the space of six months to overhaul the structure of the JBA and implement a new combined league (the Japan Professional Basketball League) to start play in 2016.

National teams

Men

Women

Current title holders
Source: JBA

Domestic

Senior

Competitions
B.League
Women's Japan Basketball League
All Japan Basketball (also known as Emperor's Cup) - Domestic cup (men and women)
All Japan Intercollegiate Basketball Championship

Partnership with Australia
Since 2018, there has been an ongoing partnership with the Basketball Australia.

References

External links
Official website

Basketball in Japan
Basketball governing bodies in Asia
Sports organizations established in 1930
Basketball